Elections to Weymouth and Portland Borough Council were held on 3 May 2007. One third of the council was up for election and the council stayed under no overall control.

After the election, the composition of the council was
Conservative 14
Liberal Democrat 11
Labour 6
Independent 5

Election result

Ward results

References
2007 Weymouth and Portland election result
Ward results
Voters boot out serving councillors
Old guard ousted in shock results

2007
2007 English local elections
2000s in Dorset